The Academy of the Immaculate Conception (generally abbreviated as AIC, or simply La Inmaculada) is a coeducational Catholic school located in Mayagüez, Puerto Rico. Founded in 1905, it is among Puerto Rico's oldest institutions of learning. Though established by the Daughters of Charity of Saint Vincent de Paul, since 2015 it is owned and operated by the Colegio Católico Notre Dame in Caguas.

The school is divided into two buildings in the same complex, one, located at 852 Road 108, Miradero, Mayagüez, has classrooms from pre-pre-kindergarten till fourth grade, while the other, at 850 Road 108, ranges from fifth grade up to twelfth grade. With the San Carlos School in Aguadilla, it is one of two Redemptorist-founded schools in the Mayagüez diocese. The school is a participant of the Free School Selection Program since its inception in 2019.

History 

In 1904, as a consequence of the entry of American women into Puerto Rican society, itself a result of the Treaty of Paris that ended the Spanish–American War, sisters belonging to the order of Daughters of Charity of St. Vincent de Paul from Emmitsburg, Maryland, arrived to Puerto Rico. The following 8 September 1905, at the behest of the Redemptorist Fathers, six sisters of the order, including Sister Mary Padden Cassini, opened Puerto Rico's first parochial. Originally named Academia San Vincente de Paul y La Candelaria, after the founder of the order and the patron saint of Mayagüez, it was later renamed to its present name. Originally it only taught primary levels, with 360 students enrolled in its first year. Later on, the sisters opened a second school, the Colegio del Carmen, in the Playa sector of Mayagüez barrio-pueblo, which closed down in 1998. Due to an increase in enrollment, the school acquired and moved into a larger building next to the previous location of the Casino de Mayagüez on Méndez Vigo Street. It was in this location where Sister Mary Padden Cassinni organized the precursor to the school cafeteria in Puerto Rico, earning her the distinction of being considered the mother of school cafeterias in Puerto Rico.

In 1908, the school started a two-year business and in 1913, the school held an Island Fair (Feria Insular), which featured oil paintings and textile work. The school building was destroyed by the 1918 San Fermín earthquake. After the earthquake, there were 26 students enrolled in the Junior Red Cross, contributing $6.50 in donations. Nonetheless, the school reopened in a temporary wooden building in September 1921. The following year, it expanded to include a four-year secondary school.

In 1923, La Inmaculada's impact was summarized thus:

The school received accreditation for the first time from the Puerto Rico Higher Education Commission in 1926. It was at La Inmaculada's auditorium in 1942, where parents of students at the University of Puerto Rico at Mayagüez gathered to send a telegram to then-dean Joseph Axtamayer, requesting his resignation. The school moved into a new building on José de Diego Street in 1957, enrollment reaching 1,300 students, 400 high schoolers, during the next decade. At this time, the faculty was composed by sisters from the founding order, Redemptorists Fathers and lay teachers. The knight mascot as well as the blue and white colors were adopted officially by La Inmaculada in 1966. In 1968 the school commenced construction on its present site in Miradero and started seeking Middle States (MSA) accreditation. On March of the following year, an MSA visiting committee evaluated the school and granted accreditation, while the following August the Miradero building was inaugurated with the relocation of the ninth to twelfth grades. The complex was expanded by the construction of a gymnasium in the early 1970s. In 1975, the Vincentian sisters announced their departure from the school. An annex to host the seventh and eight grades was built in 1986, and the following year, improvements to the sports facilities were carried out. Faced with the concern of an earthquake, La Inmaculada offered a seminar in September 1992 to train teachers and officials of the Mayagüez district of the Department of Education in the possibility of a seismic event.

Starting in January 1994, a new elementary school was being built in the Miradero complex, and finally inaugurated in September 1995.

To celebrate its centennial, the Senate of Puerto Rico congratulated La Inmaculada via a resolution in 2005.

On 14 February 2015, former student  and NBA athlete José Juan Barea, went to La Inmaculada to inaugurate the José Juan Barea Cup in basketball.

Hurricane María, earthquakes and COVID-19 
La Inmaculada was the victor in both the first women and men's volleyball tournaments after Hurricane María in 2017. In the former, the school beat the Colegio San Benito, while in the latter they won over the Colegio San Augstín.

On 10 March 2018, the school was host to the Puerto Rico Oratory League's (Liga de Oratoria de Puerto Rico) competition. The following August, José Juan Barea, donated 500 desks, worth over $300,000, between La Inmaculada, CROEM, the Añasco Art and Music School and Juan Lino Santiago School in Aguada.

The 2019–20 earthquakes in the south of Puerto Rico caused damage to the school. this were concentrated towards the elementary school building, where several second-storey, classrooms had fissures. The school theorized that they might use air-conditioned trailers to offer classes.

On 9 February 2019, a grassland fire occurred behind the University of Puerto Rico at Mayagüez's Civil Engineering building, which is adjacent to La Inmaculada and close to the Dr. Juan A. Rivero Zoo. The following October, a student threatened a school shooting over Snapchat as vengeance for alleged bullying. This would have happened during the school's annual "pep rally." The school denounced it to the Police, who determined that there was no crime committed. It was also referred to the FBI, who also determined there was no criminal activity. Additionally, it was referred to the Minor's Advocate, with the school making press release determining that since it was referred, it no longer involved the school.

Since August, the school is a participant of the Free School Selection Program, underwhich students can receive a cost-free education in a private institution for one or two years.

In February 2021, there was an alleged case of cyberbullying by male twelfth grade students who were photoshopping female students' faces unto other bodies.

School community

Accreditation 

Since 1926, it has been accredited at times by the Puerto Rico Education Council, as in 2016 it was not, but by 2021 it had regained its accredited status. In addition, since 2015, the school has also been accredited by Cognia.

Even though La Inmaculada received initial accreditation from the Middles States Association in 1969, as of 2021, it no longer holds said distinction.

Student organizations 

Students' organizations include: National Honor Society, Clubs and Student Council. The school's film club co-hosts the short film school festival Ponte los Cortos ("Put on the Shorts") at Cabo Rojo's Exclesior Cinema-Theatre.

The school's Knights Athletic Association hosts an annual Athlete's Night to recognize the school's athletes and coaches.

The school's cheerleading team has received donations from the government, such as $500.00 from the Legislative Assembly for uniforms and other costs. Since Antonio Fas Alzamora is an alumni, there was a strong bond between the Legislative Assembly and the school during his incumbency, such as when two Girl Scouts from the school occupied senators seats symbolically during a day in March 1996. Four years later, the twelfth grade class visited the Senate, where senators Rafael Luis Irizarry Cruz and Miriam J. Ramírez de Ferrer highlighted that their respective children had all graduated from the institution.

La Inmaculada is one of six schools in Puerto Rico that maintain an agreement with R2DEEP, the Recruitment, Retention and Distance Education in Engineering Program, which permits high school students participate in university-level courses and receive grades from the University of Puerto Rico at Mayagüez.

The school hosts alumni initiatives, such as Héctor Alexis Vargas' Patinero ("Skater") Foundation.

School personnel

List of school officials 

  Zoé–principal ( 1968)
 Andrés Spacht, CSsR–Director-Pastor ( 1986)
 Dr. Antonio Hernández, CSsR–Director-Reverend ( 1994)

Notable faculty 
 Anibelle Altieri–former Biology teacher, taught at age twenty in La Inmaculada while raising two children, teaching physics at CROEM and completing her Master's. Recipient of the best bariatrician in Puerto Rico award for ten consecutive years (1999–2009).
Myrna Lugo Torres–former-10th grade teacher, founder of Fundación para el Desarrollo Integral de la Mujer and former-president of the Cabo Rojo House of Culture.
Christine Matos Pagón–physical education teacher and coach.
Omar Palermo Torres–Spanish teacher and writer.
 Nellie Vera Sánchez–former high school teacher, received the National Heritage Fellowship at age 95, noted for her mundillo craftwork.

Graduating classes

Notable alumni 
 Elba A. Acevedo Pérez (Class of '86, High School)–lawyer and assistant prosecutor.
Gabriel Alcaraz Emanuelli–former-Secretary of Transportation and Public Works of Puerto Rico.
Pablo Iván Altieri Nieto (Class of '65, High School)–cardiologist and chair University of Puerto Rico School of Medicine's Cardiovascular Medicine department.
Arnaldo Ruiz (Class of '90, High School)–former-member of the Puerto Rico Tourism Company board.
José Enrique Arrarás Mir–first chancellor of the University of Puerto Rico at Mayagüez (1966–1971), former president of the Puerto Rico Olympic Committee (1973-1977), former-Secretary of Housing of Puerto Rico (1973–1976), former Liga Atlética Interuniversitaria de Puerto Rico Commissioner (2002–2018).
J.J. Barea (5th–11th grade student)–NBA player.
Roberto E. Biaggi Busquests (Class of '65, High School)–businessman and former member of the University of Puerto Rico's board of trustees.
Lorraine M. Biaggi Trigo (Class of '88, High School)–judge.
Lucy Boscana Bravo–actress, considered the "First Lady of Puerto Rican Theatre."
Orlando Bravo–billionaire businessman, co-founder and managing partner of Thoma Bravo.
Lirelis Casiano–volleyball athlete and daughter of Eddie Casiano.
Fermín M. Contreras Gómez (Class of '84, High School)–former-Puerto Rico Insurance Commissioner.
Omar M. Contreras Gómez (Class of '86, High School)–former-member of the Puerto Rico Tourism Company board.
José M. D’Anglada Raffucci (Class of '90, High School)–former-director of the Senate President's legal advisors office and judge.
Antonio de Vera Fernández–former-CEO of the American Red Cross in Puerto Rico.
Manuel Díaz Pérez (Class of '19, High School)–Armando "Mandy" Cañizares athlete of the year prize recipient and Barton Bulldogs soccer athlete.
Fernando E. Fagundo Fagundo (Class of '65, High School)–former-Secretary of Transportation and Public Works of Puerto Rico.
Carlos Fajardo Heyliger–artist and university professor.
Antonio Faría Soto–former-Commissioner of Financial Institutions.
Antonio J. Fas Alzamora–longest-serving legislator in the history of Puerto Rico.
José Feliciano Babilonia–vocalist and reggaetón singer better for his artistic name, "El Joey."
Néstor S. García Sotelo–lawyer and former-district attorney.
Lizandra Irizarry Otaño (Class of '89, High School)–lawyer and assistant prosecutor.
Viviani López Rivera–second-place winner at the Hispanic Heritage Contest (Certamen Herencia Hispana).
Eric William Mamery–radio presenter, publicist and son of Gilbert Mamery.
Carlos A. Marín Vargas (Class of '91, High School)–former-president of the Puerto Rico Labor Relations Board.
Tamara del C. Martínez Rosado (Class of '96, High School)–lawyer and assistant prosecutor.
Alberto Medina Carrero–writer and lawyer.
Agnes Mojica–chancellor of the Inter American University of Puerto Rico's San Germán Campus.
Pier Paolo Montaperto Rodríguez (Class of '93, High School)–lawyer and assistant prosecutor.
Eurípides Quiñones–former-CORCO Production Services Superintendent.
Juan Ramírez de Arellano Cardona–5th grade competitor at the Puerto Rico Mathematical Olympics.
Camille Rivera Pérez-former-Director of the House of Representatives' Legal Advisors Office and judge.
Derick Rosado–2017 most valuable male volleyball player.
Eddie Ruiz Santana–2019 Knights cup recipient.
Nashira Ortiz–2017 most valuable female volleyball player.
Francelis Ortiz Pagán (Class of '92, High School)–assassinated San Juan prosecutor.
Maribel Sánchez Muñoz–former-Family Relations Advocate.
Luis Santaliz Capestany (Class of '39, High School)–Las Marías mayor (1945–1948), delegate to the Constitutional Convention (1951–1952) and Senator for the IV district (1961–1969).
Héctor A. Santiago González–former-Associate Commissioner of the Puerto Rico Public Service Appeals Commission.
Ellen Marie Santiago Quiles–OneWest Bank Vice President.
Ángel J. Seda Comas–former-Vice president (1983–1985) and member of the board of the Puerto Rico Industrial Development Company.
Juan B. Tomasini Parés (Class of '81, High School)-cultural advisor at the Office of the Governor's Office of Education, Culture and Sports.
José Vallenilla Villafañe–radio presenter, better known by his artistic name, "Funky Joe."
Héctor Alexis Vargas (Middle school graduate)–skater, Patinero Foundation promotor, also known as "Chagy Vargas."
Manuel Vera Vera (Class of '91, High School)–Administrative Judge of the Aguadilla Court.
Ana Vilella–retired Eugenio María de Hostos, Mayagüez school science teacher.

Notes

References

External links
 Official website
 

1905 establishments in Puerto Rico
Catholic secondary schools in Puerto Rico
Catholic schools in Puerto Rico
Education in Mayagüez, Puerto Rico
Educational institutions established in 1905
Vincentian schools